Gorenji Log is a small settlement on the left bank of the Soča River southwest of Most na Soči in the Municipality of Tolmin in the Littoral region of Slovenia. The Bohinj Railway line runs through the settlement.

References

External links 
Gorenji Log on Geopedia

Populated places in the Municipality of Tolmin